This is a list of seasons completed by the Houston Texans, an American football franchise of the National Football League (NFL). The team currently has eight winning seasons, two 8–8 seasons, and ten losing seasons. The Texans clinched their first playoff berth and AFC South title on December 11, 2011 by beating the Cincinnati Bengals 20–19. They are the only team to never win a postseason game on the road and also the only one to have not reached a Conference Championship Game.

Seasons

All-time records

References

 

 
Houston Texans
Seasons